Thomas Sidney Cooper  (26 September 18037 February 1902) was an English landscape painter noted for his images of cattle and farm animals.

Biography
Thomas Sidney Cooper was born in St Peter's Street in Canterbury, Kent, and as a small child he began to show strong artistic inclinations, but the circumstances of his family did not allow him to receive any systematic training.  By the time he was twelve years old, he was working in the shop of a coach painter. Later he obtained a job as a scene painter; and he alternated between these two occupations for about eight years. He still felt a desire to become an artist, and all his spare moments were spent drawing and painting from nature. At the age of twenty he went to London, drew for a while in the British Museum, and was admitted as a student of the Royal Academy.

He then returned to Canterbury, where he was able to earn a living as a drawing-master and by the sale of sketches and drawings. In 1827 he settled in Brussels and married; there he met Eugène Joseph Verboeckhoven. Because of the Belgian Revolution he returned to London, and by showing his first picture at the Royal Academy (1833) began an unprecedentedly prolonged career as an exhibitor. When the competition was announced for the decoration for the new Houses of Parliament, to be held at Westminster Hall in 1847, Cooper submitted The Defeat of Kellermann's Cuirassiers and Carabiniers by Somerset's Cavalry Brigade at Waterloo, June 18, 1815, without success. In order to complete the picture, the artist used Siborne's model of the battlefield then on exhibition in London, while a friend in Brussels sent him breastplates worn by the various cavalry regiments, and a trooper of the Life Guards acted as a model.

He is mainly associated with pictures of cattle or sheep, a fact that earned him the epithet "Cow Cooper". Cooper collaborated between 1847 and 1870 with Frederick Richard Lee R.A. on several paintings, Lee undertaking the landscapes, and Cooper adding animals to complete the scene. He was elected an Associate of the Royal Academy (ARA) in 1845 and Royal Academician (RA) on 22 June 1867. The oldest member of the Royal Academy of Arts at the time of the accession of King Edward VII in 1901, Cooper was in July 1901 received by the King in audience, and appointed a Commander of the Royal Victorian Order (CVO).

He was a great philanthropist in Canterbury, and used some of his wealth to distribute bread and coal to the poor at Christmas. The Alms Houses in Chantry Lane Canterbury are wrongly attributed to him as they were donated by Thomas Sankey Cooper and his brother Henry. Most notably in 1882 he developed his private art lessons into a full-fledged art school in Canterbury, located at his home and studio in St Peter's Street. Originally called the Canterbury Sidney Cooper School of Art, Cooper's art school is still in existence although it is now called the University for the Creative Arts. Amongst Cooper's more well-known students was Mary Tourtel, creator and illustrator of the Rupert Bear books for children.

He wrote his reminiscences, under the title of My Life, in 1890. The largest public collection of Cooper paintings is owned by Canterbury City Council and housed at the Beaney House of Art & Knowledge in Canterbury. Examples are also held by the Tate Gallery, London, and the Victoria and Albert Museum, London, and other public collections, mainly in Britain.

Selected paintings
Milking Time (1834)
A Summer's Noon (1836)
A Drover's Halt on the Fells (1838)
A Group in the Meadows (1845)
Waterloo, the defeat of Kellerman's Cuirassiers (1847)
The Shepherd's Sabbath (1866)
Milking Time in the Meadow
The Monarch of the Meadows (1873)
Separated but not Divorced (1874)
Isaac's Substitute (1880)
Pushing off for Tilbury Fort (1884)
Cattle and Sheep in a Landscape (1888)
On a Farm in East Kent (1889)
Return to the Farm, Milking Time (1897)

See also
William Sidney Cooper
British art

Notes

References
 Sartin, Stephen (1976). Thomas Sidney Cooper, C.V.O., R.A., 1803-1902. Leigh-on-Sea: F. Lewis.
 Westwood, Kenneth J. (2011) Thomas Sidney Cooper C.V.O, R.A. His Life and Work. 2 vols. Barrington, David Leathers Publishing.
Attribution:

External links

 
Paintings by T S Cooper (Tate Gallery)
Paintings by T S Cooper (Art Renewal Center Museum)

1803 births
1902 deaths
Royal Academicians
People from Canterbury
19th-century English painters
English male painters
English landscape painters
Animal artists
19th-century English male artists